Greatest Hits is a greatest hits compilation album by the American musician Wesley Willis, released on July 7, 1995.

Background
The album is a compilation of songs from Willis' output from 1992 to 1995, compiled by Alternative Tentacles' label manager Jello Biafra. This includes then-unreleased tracks and over 10 CDs. Most songs follow Willis' trademark style of simplistic, repetitive songwriting and lyrics that discuss influences, comical situations, and personal issues of physical and mental health due to Willis's chronic schizophrenia. Most of his songs use instrumentals made with a 1980's Casio keyboard. His songs often end with the phrase "Rock over London, rock on Chicago," followed by a sponsor, such as "Wheaties: Breakfast of Champions." The song "Rock N Roll McDonalds," Willis's most popular song, was used in the film Super Size Me.

Reception
In a review for AllMusic, Blake Butler wrote the CD is "a must for everyone with a sense of humor".

Track listing
Adapted from CD liner notes.

Note: the 1995 vinyl version removes track 15; the 2001 vinyl version removes tracks 16, 20, and 21.

Personnel
Adapted from LP liner notes:
Wesley Willis – writer, vocals, programming, artwork
Jello Biafra – compiler
Wesley Willis Fiasco – backing band (14-16)
Dale Meiners – mixing (tracks 14, 15), recording (tracks 14–16)
John Yates – additional art, layout

References

External links

1995 greatest hits albums
Rock compilation albums
Alternative Tentacles compilation albums
Outsider music albums